The following outline is provided as an overview of and topical guide to Nicaragua:

Nicaragua – sovereign, representative democratic republic and the most extensive nation in Central America.  It is also the least densely populated with a demographic similar in size to its smaller neighbors. The country is bordered by Honduras to the north and by Costa Rica to the south. The Pacific Ocean lies to the west of the country, while the Caribbean Sea lies to the east. Falling within the tropics, Nicaragua sits 11 degrees north of the Equator, in the Northern Hemisphere.

The country's name is derived from Nicarao, the name of the Nahuatl-speaking tribe which inhabited the shores of Lago de Nicaragua before the Spanish conquest of the Americas, and the Spanish word , meaning water, due to the presence of the large lakes Lago de Nicaragua (Cocibolca) and Lago de Managua (Xolotlán), as well as lagoons and rivers in the region.

At the time of the Spanish conquest, Nicaragua was the name given to the narrow strip of land between Lake Nicaragua and the Pacific Ocean. Chief Nicarao ruled over the land when the first conquerors arrived. The term was eventually applied, by extension, to the Nicarao or Niquirano groups that inhabited that region.

The Nicarao tribe migrated to the area from northern regions after the fall of Teotihuacán, on the advice of their religious leaders. According to tradition, they were to travel south until they encountered a lake with two volcanoes rising out of the waters, and so they stopped when they reached Ometepe, the largest fresh-water volcanic island in the world.

General reference 

 Pronunciation:
 Common English country name:  Nicaragua
 Official English country name:  The Republic of Nicaragua
 Common endonym(s):  
 Official endonym(s):  
 Adjectival(s): Nicaraguan
 Demonym(s):  Nicaraguan (English), Nicaragüense (Spanish), Nica (Spanish)
 International rankings of Nicaragua
 ISO country codes:  NI, NIC, 558
 ISO region codes:  See ISO 3166-2:NI
 Internet country code top-level domain:  .ni

Geography of Nicaragua 

Geography of Nicaragua
 Nicaragua is: a country
 Location:
 Northern Hemisphere and Western Hemisphere
 Americas
 North America
 Middle America
 Central America
 Time zone:  Central Standard Time (UTC-06)
 Extreme points of Nicaragua
 High:  Mogoton 
 Low:  North Pacific Ocean and Caribbean Sea 0 m
 Land boundaries:  1,231 km
 922 km
 309 km
 Coastline:  910 km
 Population of Nicaragua: 5,603,000  - 107th most populous country
 Area of Nicaragua: 129,494 km2
 Atlas of Nicaragua

Environment of Nicaragua 

 Climate of Nicaragua
 Protected areas of Nicaragua
 Wildlife of Nicaragua
 Fauna of Nicaragua
 Birds of Nicaragua
 Mammals of Nicaragua

Natural geographic features of Nicaragua 

 Islands of Nicaragua
 Mountains of Nicaragua
 Volcanoes in Nicaragua
 Rivers of Nicaragua
 World Heritage Sites in Nicaragua

Regions of Nicaragua

Administrative divisions of Nicaragua 

Administrative divisions of Nicaragua
 Departments of Nicaragua
 Municipalities of Nicaragua

Departments of Nicaragua 

Departments of Nicaragua

Municipalities of Nicaragua 

Municipalities of Nicaragua
 Capital of Nicaragua: Managua
 Cities of Nicaragua

Demography of Nicaragua 

Demographics of Nicaragua

Government and politics of Nicaragua 

Politics of Nicaragua
 Form of government:
 Capital of Nicaragua: Managua
 Elections in Nicaragua
 Political parties in Nicaragua

Branches of the government of Nicaragua 

Government of Nicaragua

Executive branch of the government of Nicaragua 
 Head of state: President of Nicaragua,
 Head of government: Prime Minister of Nicaragua,
 Cabinet of Nicaragua

Legislative branch of the government of dicksa 

 National Assembly of Nicaragua (unicameral)

Judicial branch of the government of Nicaragua 

Court system of Nicaragua
 Supreme Court of Nicaragua

Foreign relations of Nicaragua 

Foreign relations of Nicaragua
 Diplomatic missions in Nicaragua
 Diplomatic missions of Nicaragua

International organization membership 
The Republic of Nicaragua is a member of:

Agency for the Prohibition of Nuclear Weapons in Latin America and the Caribbean (OPANAL)
Central American Bank for Economic Integration (BCIE)
Central American Common Market (CACM)
Central American Integration System (SICA)
Food and Agriculture Organization (FAO)
Group of 77 (G77)
Inter-American Development Bank (IADB)
International Atomic Energy Agency (IAEA)
International Bank for Reconstruction and Development (IBRD)
International Civil Aviation Organization (ICAO)
International Criminal Police Organization (Interpol)
International Development Association (IDA)
International Federation of Red Cross and Red Crescent Societies (IFRCS)
International Finance Corporation (IFC)
International Fund for Agricultural Development (IFAD)
International Labour Organization (ILO)
International Maritime Organization (IMO)
International Monetary Fund (IMF)
International Olympic Committee (IOC)
International Organization for Migration (IOM)
International Red Cross and Red Crescent Movement (ICRM)
International Telecommunication Union (ITU)
International Telecommunications Satellite Organization (ITSO)
International Trade Union Confederation (ITUC)

Inter-Parliamentary Union (IPU)
Latin American Economic System (LAES)
Latin American Integration Association (LAIA) (observer)
Multilateral Investment Guarantee Agency (MIGA)
Nonaligned Movement (NAM)
Organisation for the Prohibition of Chemical Weapons (OPCW)
Organization of American States (OAS)
Permanent Court of Arbitration (PCA)
Rio Group (RG)
Unión Latina
United Nations (UN)
United Nations Conference on Trade and Development (UNCTAD)
United Nations Educational, Scientific, and Cultural Organization (UNESCO)
United Nations High Commissioner for Refugees (UNHCR)
United Nations Industrial Development Organization (UNIDO)
Universal Postal Union (UPU)
World Confederation of Labour (WCL)
World Customs Organization (WCO)
World Federation of Trade Unions (WFTU)
World Health Organization (WHO)
World Intellectual Property Organization (WIPO)
World Meteorological Organization (WMO)
World Tourism Organization (UNWTO)
World Trade Organization (WTO)

Law and order in Nicaragua 

 Constitution of Nicaragua
 Human rights in Nicaragua
 LGBT rights in Nicaragua
 Law enforcement in Nicaragua

Military of Nicaragua 

Military of Nicaragua
 Command
 Commander-in-chief:
 Forces
 Army of Nicaragua
 Navy of Nicaragua
 Air Force of Nicaragua

History of Nicaragua 

History of Nicaragua
 Economic history of Nicaragua
 Spanish conquest of Nicaragua

Culture of Nicaragua 

Culture of Nicaragua
 Cuisine of Nicaragua
 Languages of Nicaragua
 Media in Nicaragua
 National symbols of Nicaragua
 Coat of arms of Nicaragua
 Flag of Nicaragua
 National anthem of Nicaragua
 People of Nicaragua
 Prostitution in Nicaragua
 Public holidays in Nicaragua
 Religion in Nicaragua
 Buddhism in Nicaragua
 Islam in Nicaragua
 World Heritage Sites in Nicaragua

Art in Nicaragua 
 Literature of Nicaragua
 Music of Nicaragua

Sports in Nicaragua 

 Football in Nicaragua
Nicaragua at the Olympics

Economy and infrastructure of Nicaragua 

Economy of Nicaragua
 Economic rank, by nominal GDP (2007): 134th (one hundred and thirty fourth)
 Agriculture in Nicaragua
 Banking in Nicaragua
 Communications in Nicaragua
 Internet in Nicaragua
 Companies of Nicaragua
Currency of Nicaragua: Córdoba
ISO 4217: NIO
 Economic history of Nicaragua
 Nicaragua Stock Exchange
 Tourism in Nicaragua
 Transport in Nicaragua
 Airports in Nicaragua
 Rail transport in Nicaragua
 Water supply and sanitation in Nicaragua

Education in Nicaragua 

Education in Nicaragua

See also 

Index of Nicaragua-related articles
Member state of the United Nations
Outline of geography
Outline of North America

References

External links 

 General
 Nicaragua. The World Factbook. Central Intelligence Agency.
 Country profile of Nicaragua by BBC News

 Maps

 Maps of Nicaragua at WorldAtlas.com

.
 
Nicaragua